The 4th FINA Open Water Swimming World Championships were held August 29-September 3, 2006 in Naples, Italy. 

The championships featured 98 swimmers from 29 countries competing in race distances of 5-kilometer (5K), 10-kilometer (10K) and 25-kilometer (25K). Event schedule:
Tuesday, August 29: Women's 5K, Men's 5K
Thursday, August 31: Men's 10K, Women's 5K
Saturday, September 2: Women's 25K
Sunday, September 3: Men's 25K

Results

Team standings
The Championship Trophy point standing for the 2006 Open Water Worlds is:

The following 13 countries are listed in a tie for 16, with zero (0) points: 

 Macedonia

Note:  is the sole country with an entry not listed in the standings. Their lone entrant (Darjia Pop) did not finish the one event (Women's 10K) in which she was entered.

See also
2004 FINA World Open Water Swimming Championships
2008 FINA World Open Water Swimming Championships

References

FINA World Open Water Swimming Championships
Fina World Open Water Swimming Championships, 2006
Fina World Open Water Swimming Championships, 2006
International aquatics competitions hosted by Italy
Swimming competitions in Italy